Tom Gilroy is an American director, writer, actor, producer, playwright, poet, musician, and teacher. Gilroy has written, directed and produced five films, including the award-winning short Touch Base and the critically acclaimed feature Spring Forward. He has appeared in over 20 television shows and 30 films.

With his theatre company Machine Full, Gilroy has produced over a dozen critically acclaimed productions, most recently the multi-media production of Hamlet for the New Jersey Shakespeare Festival. Gilroy is also a published haiku poet, having authored the haiku year and Haiku, Not Bombs among others.

Gilroy has collaborated with Michael Stipe on several projects, including "Everything’s Coming Undone," for the compilation album Ciao My Shining Star, The Songs of Mark Mulcahy. He has performed as a musician on tracks by Stipe, Mark Mulcahy, Dub Gabriel, and Ariel Aparicio, whose album Aerials he produced.

Gilroy has also taught as a professor at Columbia University and Davidson College.

Career

Directing 
Tom Gilroy has written, directed and produced five films. Among them are three shorts, the award-winning Touch Base, Mr. Sycamore, and It Happened Today, his most recent collaboration with R.E.M.

He has also written and directed the critically lauded feature Spring Forward, starring Liev Schreiber, Ned Beatty, and Campbell Scott. His most recent feature film as writer/director is The Cold Lands, starring Lili Taylor, which premiered at the Berlinale Film Festival in 2013. The film also featured a book of photography and haiku, entitled Somebody Else’s Nowhere: Haiku and Images from The Cold Lands.

Gilroy is currently developing another feature-length film entitled Our Lady of the Snow, which recently won the prestigious San Francisco Film Society/KRF Grant and received fellowships from the Djerassi and McDowell colonies.

As a screenwriter, Gilroy was commissioned to write a feature film for Orange is the New Black'''s Nick Sandow. Entitled Star of the Sea, it will be Sandow’s third feature as a director.

 Acting 
Gilroy has appeared in over 20 television shows including Law & Order, Sex and the City, and Damages. He also acted in upwards of 30 films, having worked with such directors as Ken Loach, Sidney Lumet, Jean-Luc Godard, Lodge Kerrigan, Dan Minehan, Jim McKay, Christopher Munch, Ali Selim, Cam Archer, Paul Auster and multi-media artist Robert Longo.

He has also played dozens of characters on Wake Up, World, the long-running touring satire of morning news shows from the mind of The Daily Show creator Lizz Winstead, for which he was a writer and director.

 Theater 
Gilroy’s plays have been produced in several US cities and around the world. With his theatre company Machine Full (co-founded with Lili Taylor and Michael Imperioli), he has written numerous critically acclaimed plays, most notably The Invisible Hand and Halcion Days. His other works include Sugar Cane and Coffee Cup, Collateral Damage, American Lesion, Witch’s Tit, and The Invisible Hand.

In 2005 he directed Rosie Perez, Robert Sean Leonard, Natasha Lyonne, and Mary-Louise Parker in the play Nine Ten for the 24 Hour play project. He has also directed a production of Arthur Miller’s Incident At Vichy.

Most recently, Gilroy produced and directed the multi-media production of Hamlet for the New Jersey Shakespeare festival, starring Richard Harris, Jared Harris, and Lili Taylor.

 Poetry 
Gilroy has authored various haiku pieces, including the haiku year, Haiku, Not Bombs, the Festival Of Writers Haiku Project, and Somebody Else’s Nowhere, which features haiku and photography.

 Music 
Gilroy has collaborated with Michael Stipe on several projects, including "Everything’s Coming Undone," for the compilation album Ciao My Shining Star, The Songs of Mark Mulcahy. He has performed as a musician on tracks by Stipe, Mark Mulcahy, Dub Gabriel, and Ariel Aparicio, whose album Aerials'' he produced.

Academics 
As a professor, Gilroy has taught at multiple prestigious institutions. He taught at Columbia University for five semesters, and at Davidson College for one.

Gilroy is a three-time MacDowell Fellow and a two-time Sundance Lab Fellow. He has also received the 2015 Kenneth Rainin Screenwriting Grant from the San Francisco Film Society and the Esteemed McGee Chair for Filmmaking at Davidson College. Gilroy also won the 2015 Djerassi Residency Award from the San Francisco Film Society.

Filmography

Film

Television

References

External links

People from Ridgefield, Connecticut
American male film actors
Male actors from New York (state)
English-language haiku poets
Year of birth missing (living people)
Living people